The Roman Catholic Diocese of Mtwara is a diocese located in Mtwara in the Ecclesiastical province of Songea in Tanzania.

History
 December 22, 1931: Established as Territorial Abbacy of Mtwara from the Roman Catholic Diocese of Lindi
 December 18, 1972: Promoted as Diocese of Mtwara

Bishops

Ordinaries
 Territorial Abbots of Mtwara (Roman rite)
 Bishop Joachim Ammann, O.S.B. (1932.05.29 – 1948.12.15)
 Bishop Anthony Victor Hälg, O.S.B. (1949.12.15 – 1972)
 Bishops of Mtwara (Roman rite)
 Bishop Maurus Libaba (1972.12.18 – 1986.10.17), appointed Bishop of Lindi
 Bishop Gabriel Mmole (1988.03.12 - 2015.10.15)
 Bishop Titus Joseph Mdoe (since 2015.10.15)

Coadjutor Bishop
Anthony Victor Haelg (Hälg), O.S.B. (1949)

See also
Roman Catholicism in Tanzania

References

Sources
 Catholic Hierarchy

External links
 GCatholic.org
 Catholic Hierarchy

Mtwara
Christian organizations established in 1931
Roman Catholic dioceses and prelatures established in the 20th century
Mtwara, Roman Catholic Diocese of